David Alexander Gibbs (born January 10, 1968) is an American football coach and former player. He was most recently the defensive coordinator for Texas Tech University, a position he held since January 2015. Gibbs previously served in a similar capacity at the University of Minnesota, Auburn University, and the University of Houston, as well as an assistant coach in the National Football League (NFL) for the Denver Broncos, Kansas City Chiefs and Houston Texans.

Playing career
Gibbs began his playing career at Auburn High School, in Auburn, Alabama, while his father was offensive coordinator at nearby Auburn University. Gibbs went on to attend the University of Colorado, where he was a four-year letterman at defensive back from 1986 through 1990. He was named to the Academic All-Big Eight team as a senior, leading the Buffaloes to the 1990 national championship under coach Bill McCartney.

Coaching career
After graduating from Colorado, Gibbs served as a graduate assistant at the University of Oklahoma and at Colorado. In 1995, he became the secondary coach at the University of Kansas under head coach Glen Mason. When Mason was appointed head coach at the University of Minnesota in 1997, Gibbs was hired as the Golden Gophers' defensive coordinator, the youngest coordinator in Division I-A at that time. Gibbs improved a Minnesota defense that had ranked last in the Big Ten Conference in 1996 to one that was ranked eighth in the nation in pass and scoring defense by 1999.

From 2001 through 2004, Gibbs coached defense for the Denver Broncos, which by 2003 was rated the fourth strongest defense in the NFL. In 2005, he returned to Auburn to be defensive coordinator for Auburn University, where his defense ranked sixth in the NCAA in scoring defense and led the Southeastern Conference (SEC) in sacks. Gibbs became defensive backs coach for the Kansas City Chiefs in 2006.

Gibbs was hired as defensive backs coach by the Houston Texans in January 2009. Following the 2010 season, the Texans fired him along with defensive coordinator Frank Bush. After a one-year hiatus from coaching, he spent 2012 coaching defensive backs for the Virginia Destroyers of the United Football League (UFL).

Gibbs accepted the position of defensive coordinator at the University of Houston on January 15, 2013. He resigned that position on January 5, 2015, after coaching the biggest winning fourth quarter comeback in bowl history at the 2015 Armed Forces Bowl with the score of 35–34. On January 5, 2015, Gibbs was hired for the same position at Texas Tech. He was Texas Tech's sixth defensive coordinator since 2009.

Personal life
Gibbs is the son of Alex Gibbs, a longtime NFL assistant coach.

Head coaching record

Notes

References

External links
 

1968 births
Living people
American football defensive backs
Auburn Tigers football coaches
Colorado Buffaloes football players
Denver Broncos coaches
Houston Cougars football coaches
Houston Texans coaches
Kansas City Chiefs coaches
Kansas Jayhawks football coaches
Minnesota Golden Gophers football coaches
Texas Tech Red Raiders football coaches
Virginia Destroyers coaches
Auburn High School (Alabama) alumni
People from Mount Airy, North Carolina